Jinasena (c. 9th century CE) was a monk and scholar in the Digambara tradition of Jainism. He was patronized by the Rashtrakuta king Amoghavarsha I. He was the author of  Adipurana and Mahapurana.

Jinasena was the disciple of Acharya Virasena and he completed the commentary Dhavala on Ṣaṭkhaṅḍāgama, a revered text in the Digambara tradition. The name is shared by an earlier Acharya Jinasena who was the author of  Harivamsa Purana.

Life
Acharya Jinasena was a 9th-century CE Jain scholar who belonged to the Panchastupanvaya. He was a disciple of Virasena. He claimed that Rishabhanatha first taught humanity how to extract sugarcane juice and that the fire by itself was not divine. Rastrakuta king Amoghavarsha was his disciple.

Jinasena had prohibited the use of meat, honey and other similar materials in Jain rituals due to their connection with violence. He gave recognition to the dvijas (twice-born). He prohibited the use of sacred thread by artisans, dancers and shudras but allowed them to wear dhoti. He preached the importance of Dāna (charity) for Jain households.

Jinasena's lineage started with Chandrasena who initiated Aryanandi. Aryanandi initiated Virasena and Jayasena. Virasena initiated six disciples who were Dasharayguru, Jinasena, Vinayasena, Shripal, Padmasena and Devasena. Dasharayguru and Jinasena initiated Gunabhadra who later initiated Lokasena. Vinayasena initiated Kumarasena who started the Kashtha Sangha.

Works 
He  wrote the encyclopedic Adipurana. Mahapurana includes Ādi purāṇa and Uttarapurana, the project was completed by his pupil Gunabhadra.

Mahapurana is the source of the famous quote, used by Carl Sagan and many others:
Some foolish men declare that Creator made the world. The doctrine that the world was created is ill-advised, and should be rejected. If god created the world, where was he before creation? If you say he was transcendent then, and needed no support, where is he now?

No single being had the skill to make the world - for how can an immaterial god create that which is material? How could god have made the world without any raw material? If you say he made this first, and then the world, you are face with an endless regression. If you declare that the raw material arose naturally you fall into another fallacy, for the whole universe might thus have been its own creator, and have risen equally naturally. If god created the world by an act of will, without any raw material, then it is just his will and nothing else and who will believe this silly stuff?

If he is ever perfect, and complete, how could the will to create have arisen in him? If, on the other hand, he is not perfect, he could no more create the universe than a potter could. If he is formless, actionless, and all-embracing, how could he have created the world? Such a soul, devoid of all modality, would have no desire to create anything. If you say that he created to no purpose, because it was his nature to do so then god is pointless.

If he created in some kind of sport, it was the sport of a foolish child, leading to trouble. If he created out of love for living things and need of them he made the world; why did he not make creation wholly blissful, free from misfortune? Thus the doctrine that the world was created by god makes no sense at all.
[from Barbara Sproul, Primal Myths (San Francisco; Harper Row, 1979), 192].

He also wrote Dharmashastra, a lawbook for laymen.

See also 
 Harivamsa Purana

References

Citations

Sources

External links

Digambara Acharyas
Indian religious leaders
Indian Jain monks
8th-century Indian Jains
8th-century Jain monks
8th-century Indian monks
9th-century Indian Jains
9th-century Jain monks
9th-century Indian monks